Charles Otis may refer to:

 Charles Otis (fencer) (1906–1970), Canadian fencer
 Charles Otis (businessman) (1872–1944), financial publisher in New York and New England
 Charles A. Otis (1827–1905), businessman and mayor of Cleveland
 Charles Pomeroy Otis (1840–1888), American educator and author